Lukáš Šembera is a Grand Prix motorcycle racer from Czech Republic.

Career statistics

By season

Races by year

References

External links
 Profile on motogp.com

1992 births
Living people
Czech motorcycle racers
Sportspeople from Brno
125cc World Championship riders